Edam may refer to:

 Edam cheese
 Edam, Netherlands, a town in Edam-Volendam, after which the cheese is named
 Edam, Saskatchewan, a village in Canada
 Evernote Data Access and Management (EDAM) is a protocol for exchanging Evernote data with the Evernote service
 , the name of several Holland America Line vessels
 Centre for Economics and Foreign Policy Studies Ekonomi ve Dış Politika Araştırmalar Merkezi (EDAM) - an Istanbul based independent think-tank